Neoglyphidodon is a genus of fish in the family Pomacentridae.

Species
Neoglyphidodon bonang (Bleeker, 1852)    
Neoglyphidodon carlsoni (Allen, 1975)    
Neoglyphidodon crossi (Allen, 1991)
Neoglyphidodon melas (Cuvier and Valenciennes, 1830) 
Neoglyphidodon nigroris (Cuvier and Valenciennes, 1830)
Neoglyphidodon oxyodon (Bleeker, 1858)
Neoglyphidodon polyacanthus (Ogilby, 1889)    
Neoglyphidodon thoracotaeniatus (Fowler and Bean, 1928)

References

 
Pomacentrinae
Marine fish genera
Taxa named by Gerald R. Allen